"Maybe the Last Time" is a song written by James Brown (under the pseudonym Ted Wright) and recorded by Brown and the Famous Flames in 1964. It was released as the B-side of "Out of Sight" and was also included on the Out of Sight album. Brown described it as "a heavy gospel-based number, all about appreciating friends and everything while you can because each time you see somebody may be the last time, you don't know." It was the last studio recording Brown made with the Famous Flames, although the singing group continued to perform live with him for several more years.

"Maybe the Last Time" did chart, on the Bubbling Under the Hot 100, peaking at No. 7 the week of October 17, 1964. It became a frequent part of Brown and the Famous Flames' concert repertoire in the 1960s. Live performances appear on the albums Live at the Garden,  Live at the Apollo, Volume II, and Say It Live and Loud: Live in Dallas 08.26.68, and in the concert film Live at the Boston Garden.
The song has gospel antecedents, particularly an earlier recording by the Staple Singers, and similarity to a later track by the Rolling Stones 
called “The Last Time”, which borrowed its name and theme from the Brown/Famous Flames song

Personnel
 James Brown - lead vocal, piano

and The Famous Flames:
 Bobby Byrd - vocals
 Bobby Bennett - vocals
 "Baby Lloyd" Stallworth - vocals

with the James Brown Band:
 Mack Johnson - trumpet
 Ron Tooley - trumpet
 Joe Dupars - trumpet
 Robert Knight - trumpet
 Les Buie - guitar
 Bernard Odum - bass
 Melvin Parker - drums

References

James Brown songs
Songs written by James Brown
The Famous Flames songs
1964 singles
1964 songs
Smash Records singles